The Pantesco or  is an Italian breed of donkey from the Mediterranean island of Pantelleria, south-west of Sicily. It is at high risk of extinction and was listed as "critical" by the FAO in 2007. It is one of the eight autochthonous donkey breeds of limited distribution recognised by the Ministero delle Politiche Agricole Alimentari e Forestali, the Italian ministry of agriculture and forestry.

References

Donkey breeds originating in Italy
Donkey breeds
Sicily
Ark of Taste foods